Furthur Films is an American independent film and television production company. It was founded by actor Michael Douglas on November 19, 1997. The company is based in New York City but has offices located in Universal City, California.

In May 1999, Furthur Films executive Allen Burry announced that the company was interested in acquiring Tom Wolfe's novel A Man in Full for development as a television series.

Filmography
 One Night at McCool's (2001)
 Don't Say a Word (2001)
 Swimfan (2002)
 It Runs in the Family (2003)
 The In-Laws (2003)
 The Sentinel (2006)
 Beyond the Reach (2014)
 Flatliners (2017)
 We Have Always Lived in the Castle (2018)
 Ratched (2020)

References

1997 establishments in California
1997 establishments in New York (state)
Companies based in New York (state)
Entertainment companies based in California
Entertainment companies based in New York (state)
Entertainment companies established in 1997
Film production companies of the United States
Mass media companies established in 1997
Michael Douglas
Television production companies of the United States